Louis Vuillemin (19 December 1879 – 2 April 1929) was a French composer and music critic who strongly identified with his Breton heritage in his music.

Life
Vuillemin was born in Nantes, his grandfather was the piano manufacturer M. Didion. He studied cello and composition at the conservatory of Nantes and continued at the Conservatoire de Paris, 1899–1904, with Gabriel Fauré (composition) and Xavier Leroux (harmony).

He married young; his wife Lucy was a renowned singer at the time, and he collaborated with her in writing his vocal music. In 1912, he was one of the founding members of the Paris-based Association de Compositeurs Bretons. Drafted to World War I, he was severely wounded in a gas attack which is said to have cut short his life.

As a music critic, Vuillemin wrote numerous reviews for Comœdia, Musica, Le Courrier musical, Paris-Soir, La Lanterne, etc. He also wrote biographies of Gabriel Fauré (1914), Louis Aubert (1921), and Albert Roussel (1924).

Music
Vuillemin wrote in many genres including two operas, orchestral and chamber music, vocal and piano music. He attracted some attention for the Breton-influenced Soir armoricains for piano, one of many examples in which he attempted to capture the spirit of his native region. En Kernéo is another example which exists in a number of instrumentations. In these, he often used elements of Breton traditional music. An admirer of Debussy and Ravel, he set such melodies to an Impressionistic harmonic language.

Selected compositions

Stage
Le Double voile (René Fauchois), drame lyrique in 1 act (2 scenes) (1908–09)
Cache-cache, operetta, 3 acts
Yolaine
Danses de Sylla, ballet (1912)

Orchestra
Quatre Danses, Op. 16 (1924)
Cortège d'athlètes (1924)
Aubade (1925)
En Kernéo (En Cornouailles) (1925)
Épilogue (1928)
Les Pêcheurs en goguette (1931)

Chamber music
Deux Pièces, for cello and piano (1900)
Pour se distraire, for piano 4-hands (1908)
Trois Bluettes faciles, for piano 4-hands (1908)
En Kernéo (En Cornouailles), Op. 23 (1922)

Piano
Soirs armoricains. Études d'après nature, Op. 21 (1913–18)
Quatre Valses légères, Op. 22 (1921)
En Kernéo (En Cornouailles), Op. 23 (1922)
Danse bucolique (1923)
Trois Préludes (published 1948)

Vocal
For voice and piano, if not otherwise mentioned.

Romance (1898)
Adieu. Pastourelle (Jacques Patissou) (1900)
Jane (Charles Leconte de Lisle) (1900)
Rieuse (André d'Hormon) (1901)
Chanson dolente (André d'Hormon) (1902)
Chanson lasse (André d'Hormon), for voice and orchestra (1902)
Le Portrait (Léon Dierx) (1902)
Ma Cigale (Jean Marcel) (1902)
Romance (Edmond Haraucourt) (1902)
Rondels mélancoliques (Catulle Mendès) (1909)
Les Rêves (René Fauchois) (1910)
Les Petiots, voice and orchestra (1909)
Nocturne (Léo Larguier), for vocal quartet, string quartet, piano (1912)
Deux Lieds (André Hormon): 1. Présents; 2. Retour (1912)
Crépuscule (1912)
Pendant l'attente (1912)
Rondels mélancoliques (1913)
Rondel sur une joueuse de flûte (André d'Hormon) (1922)
La Route (Henry Montassier), for voice, violin or cello, piano (1929)

Bibliography
Véfa de Bellaing (ed.): Dictionnaire des compositeurs de musique en Bretagne (Nantes: Ouest Éditions, 1992); ; p. 250–251.
Mikael Bodlore-Penlaez & Aldo Ripoche: Musique classique bretonne / Sonerezh klasel Breizh (Spézet: Éditions Coop Breizh, 2012)); p. 82–85.

References

1879 births
1929 deaths
20th-century French composers
Breton musicians
Conservatoire de Paris alumni
French classical composers
French male classical composers
French music critics
French opera composers
Male opera composers
Musicians from Nantes
Pupils of Gabriel Fauré
19th-century French male musicians
Writers from Nantes